Freedom is an American film directed by Peter Cousens, starring Cuba Gooding Jr., William Sadler and Sharon Leal.

The film tells two stories in parallel. The first is the escape of a pre-Civil War Black family from slavery in Virginia to freedom in Canada, helped by the Underground Railroad, devout Quakers, and Frederick Douglass. The second story is the travel of an ancestor from Africa (Gambia) to a British colony in the New World (South Carolina).

Cast
Cuba Gooding Jr. as Samuel
Bernhard Forcher as John Newton
William Sadler as Plimpton
Sharon Leal as Vanessa
David Rasche as Jefferson Monroe
Terrence Mann as Barney Fagan
Michael Goodwin as Garrett
Diane Salinger as Fanny
Anna Sims as Mary

References

External links

2014 films
American drama films
Drama films based on actual events
Films about American slavery
Films about Christianity
2014 drama films
2010s English-language films
2010s American films